Rear Admiral Kenneth Allan Doolan,  (born 15 January 1939) is an Australian naval officer, author, and is the former national president of the Returned and Services League of Australia (RSL). He is a retired rear admiral in the Royal Australian Navy, his most senior commands being Maritime Commander Australia and operational commander of all Australian combatant forces deployed to the Gulf War.

Early life
Doolan was born in Sydney, New South Wales, on 15 January 1939 and received his primary education in Brisbane, Queensland.

Naval career
Doolan joined the Royal Australian Navy as a 13-year-old cadet midshipman in January 1953, attending the Royal Australian Naval College. He graduated in 1956, undertook sea training in the frigate  in 1957 and in December 1958 graduated from the Britannia Royal Naval College, Dartmouth, Devon.  
 
Significant postings held during his 41-year naval career included:
 aide-de-camp to Governor General Viscount De L’Isle, 1964–1965
 Military Secretary to Governor General Lord Casey, 1965
 Direction Officer destroyer  during the Indonesian Confrontation, 1966
 Navigating Officer, guided missile destroyer  during the Vietnam War, 1970–1971
 Canadian Forces Command and Staff College, 1980, including award of a Master Mariner’s Certificate
 commissioning Commanding Officer, amphibious heavy lift ship , 1981
 Commanding Officer, guided missile destroyer , 1984–1985
 Naval Attaché, Washington DC, United States of America, 1987–1989
 Deputy Chief of Naval Staff, 1989–1990
 Maritime Commander Australia, 1990–1991, including being appointed Operational Commander of all Australian combatant forces deployed to the Gulf War
 Assistant Chief of the Defence Force (Development), 1991–1993 (retired)

Second career
After leaving the Australian Defence Force, Doolan has been:
 Commissioner, Inquiry into the East Coast Armaments Complex, 1994–1996
 Member, Defence Force Remuneration Tribunal, 1996–1999
 National Secretary of the Order of Australia Association and Company Secretary of that Association’s Foundation, 2002–2005
 Member, National Defence Committee of the Returned and Services League, 2002 – 2009
 Established a book publishing company with his wife – Grinkle Press, 2006
 President, Australian Institute of Navigation, 2007–2009
 National President, Returned and Services League of Australia, 2009–2016

Doolan first came to public notice as national president of the RSL in late September 2009 when he made statements in support of Breeanna Till, the pregnant widow of an Australian serviceman Sergeant Brett Till who was killed in the War in Afghanistan on Operation Slipper in early 2009.

Inquiries in 2017
In 2017 Doolan became caught up in inquiries into the financial affairs of the RSL, both during the period when an RSL member, Don Rowe, was the president of the NSW branch and also during Doolan's own period as national president. One allegation, under investigation in September 2017, was that Doolan had taken steps to cover up the case of alleged financial dealings which had benefitted Rowe. Separately, in September 2017 the RSL national board launched an investigation into whether Doolan himself had, in June 2016, accepted a car worth nearly $40,000 as a retirement gift paid for out of RSL funds.

Family
Doolan is married to Elaine. They live in rural New South Wales near the national capital, Canberra, Australian Capital Territory.

Publications
 Maritime Power in the 20th Century – The Australian Experience Chapter 13, Allen & Unwin, 1998
 A commanding presence: the life of G.H. Barker bookseller, naturalist and ornithologist, Ginninderra Press, 2002
 We Were Cadet Midshipmen – RANC Entrants 50 Years On (contributor & publisher), Grinkle Press, 2006
 HMAS Tobruk: warship for every crisis, Grinkle Press, 2007
 Steel Cat: the story of HMAS Brisbane: Vietnam and Gulf War veteran, Grinkle Press, 2009

References

External links
 Biography – RSL

|-

|-

1939 births
Graduates of Britannia Royal Naval College
Australian military personnel of the Gulf War
Australian military personnel of the Vietnam War
Australian naval historians
20th-century Australian non-fiction writers
Deputy Chiefs of Naval Staff (Australia)
Graduates of the Royal Australian Naval College
Living people
Officers of the Order of Australia
Royal Australian Navy admirals
Military personnel from New South Wales
Naval attachés